Luciano Vendemini (11 July 1952 – 20 February 1977) was an Italian basketball player. He was a member of the Italian team that finished fifth at the 1976 Summer Olympics. He unexpectedly died of heart failure while sitting on a bench during a basketball match.

References

1952 births
1977 deaths
Italian men's basketball players
Olympic basketball players of Italy
Basketball players at the 1976 Summer Olympics